María Teresa Torró Flor was the defending champion, having won the event in 2012, but decided to participate at the 2013 Western & Southern Open that week.

Kristína Kučová won the title, defeating Alberta Brianti in the final, 7–5, 3–6, 6–4.

Seeds

Main draw

Finals

Top half

Bottom half

References 
 Main draw

Trofeul Popeci - Singles
Trofeul Popeci